Bronwyn Dibb (born 1997) is a New Zealand trampoline gymnast specialising in double mini trampoline. At the 2022 Trampoline Gymnastics World Championships, she won the women's double mini trampoline event.

References

1997 births
Living people
New Zealand female trampolinists
Medalists at the Trampoline Gymnastics World Championships
World champion gymnasts
Competitors at the 2022 World Games
World Games silver medalists
21st-century New Zealand women